Robin Lund is a Canadian professional baseball coach. He is the assistant pitching coach for the Detroit Tigers of Major League Baseball (MLB).

Career
Lund is from Peace River, Alberta. He played baseball in Canada through the eighth grade, when organized baseball programs ceased. He moved to Lewiston, Idaho, and stayed with a foster family to continue playing baseball at Lewiston High School. He played college baseball at Spokane Falls Community College. Lund earned a bachelor's degree in education from Whitworth College in 1995, a master's degree in exercise science from Eastern Washington University in 1997, and a Doctor of Philosophy in exercise science from the University of Idaho in 2002. Lund worked at the University of Northern Iowa as an associate professor in the Department of Kinesiology for 17 years before joining the University of Iowa as the pitching coach for the Iowa Hawkeyes in 2013.

After the 2022 season, the Tigers hired Lund as their assistant pitching coach.

Personal life
Lund met his wife, Susie, in Lewiston. They have three children.

References

Living people
Canadian baseball coaches
Canadian emigrants to the United States
Detroit Tigers coaches
Eastern Washington University alumni
Iowa Hawkeyes baseball coaches
Major League Baseball pitching coaches
Spokane Falls Bigfoot baseball players
Sportspeople from Alberta
University of Idaho alumni
University of Northern Iowa faculty
Whitworth University alumni
Year of birth missing (living people)